China Natural Gas Inc. is a Chinese energy company that, through its subsidiaries, is engaged in the distribution and sale of natural gas and gasoline to commercial, residential and industrial customers in the Xi'an area and the Shaanxi province of the People's Republic of China.

The company also engages in the construction of pipeline networks. It offers natural gas through a network of approximately 120 kilometers of high pressure pipelines and sells compressed natural gas as vehicular fuel through a network of filling stations in Shaanxi and Henan provinces.

China Natural Gas is the first Chinese natural gas retailing company to be publicly traded in the United States.

Jingbian Terminal 
The company is building a local government supported liquefied natural gas processing and distribution plant in Jingbian, Shaanxi province, which was scheduled to be completed in December 2009.

References 

Natural gas companies of China
Non-renewable resource companies established in 2005